The Karen National Liberation Army (abbreviated KNLA) is the military branch of the Karen National Union (KNU), which campaigns for the self-determination of the Karen people of Myanmar (formerly Burma). The KNLA has been fighting the Burmese government since 1949.
The KNLA was reported to have had a strength of approximately 20,000 in 1980, 3,000 in 2001, 5,000 in 2006, 6,000 in 2012, and 7,000 in 2014. As of early 2021, the KNLA is estimated to have at least 15,000 troops. The army is divided into seven brigades and a 'Special Force' reserved for special operations.

History

Pre-1990 
At the time of Burmese independence from the British in 1948, there was considerable tension between the Karen community and the Burmese majority. Some Karens sought independence while others attempted co-existence within Burma. The KNLA was previously called the Karen National Defence Organisation (KNDO). The KNDO was an armed organisation which was formed by the KNU in 1947 to defend Karen communities and interests. Most KNDO soldiers had previously served in the forces of British Burma.

In early 1949, the Burmese government arrested the Karen leader of the armed forces and replaced him with radical Burmese anti-Karen nationalist Ne Win. Continued attacks against Karen dominated townships around Rangoon and the arrest of Karen political leaders led the Karen national Union to declare armed struggle, and the world's longest running civil war began.

Early in the fighting, Karen forces overran much of northern Burma including towns such as Mandalay and established strong positions outside Rangoon at Insein Township. But lacking a port from which to receive military supplies, the Karen forces gradually withdrew to the southeast of Burma.

In 1976, the Karen National Union changed its policy on wanting an independent state, and joined a new alliance, the National Democratic Front. This alliance of armed ethnic political parties supported a federal union of Burma.

1990–2010 
In 1994 a group of Buddhist soldiers in the KNLA, claiming that the KNLA was unfairly dominated by Christians, broke away from the KNLA to form a new force, the DKBA, which soon organised a cease-fire with the Burmese military government.

In 1995 KNLA lost Kawmoora and Myawaddy to the DKBA. This considerably reduced the KNLA's border trade taxation.

A group calling itself the KNU/KNLA Peace Council, led by the former KNLA brigade 7 commander Brig-Gen Htay Maung (Htein Maung), broke away from the KNLA in February 2007, and organised a peace talk as well as a cease-fire agreement with the Burmese military government without the approval of the KNU central committee.

On 14 February 2008, Padoh Mahn Sha Lah Phan, the KNU secretary-general, was assassinated in Thailand.

On 13 May 2009, a senior Myanmar Army officer, Brig.-Gen. Kaung Myat, was killed by the KNLA. He had been the commander of the No. 5 Military Operations Command. The next month, on 19 June, DKBA soldiers began attacking the KNLA Brigade 7 headquarters, which they then captured on 23 June.

2010–present

During 2010, increasing numbers of Democratic Karen Buddhist Army (DKBA) soldiers defected to the KNLA, or fled to Thailand, following the announcement that the DKBA would be absorbed into the Burmese military government's Border Guard. The DKBA had previously been allied to, but distinct from, government forces.

In November 2010, following the general election of 2010, large parts of the Democratic Karen Buddhist Army are alleged to have mutinied and re-aligned themselves with the KNLA, resulting in the escalating conflict with junta troops. The two rebel armies have formed an alliance, in advance of a possible crackdown by the military government.

The KNLA, along with its parent organisation the KNU, signed the Nationwide Ceasefire Agreement (NCA) with the government of Myanmar on 15 October 2015, along with several other insurgent groups.

In September 2016, KNLA fighters began clashing with members of the Mon National Liberation Army (MNLA), the armed wing of the New Mon State Party (NMSP), in the Tanintharyi Region. Both the KNU and NMSP were signatories of the Nationwide Ceasefire Agreement (NCA) at the time of the fighting. A temporary bilateral truce was reached between the two groups on 14 March 2018.

Tensions between the KNU and the Tatmadaw increased as unrest swept the country following the 2021 Myanmar coup d'état.  On 27 March 2021, KNLA Brigade 5 overran a Myanmar Army base near the Thai border, killing 10 soldiers including a deputy battalion commander.  The Myanmar army launched multiple airstrikes on Karen villages in retaliation.

On 27 April 2021, the KNLA captured a Myanmar Army base along the Salween river, bordering Thailand's Mae Sam Laep sub-district.  A civilian in on the Thai side of the border was wounded by a stray bullet during the battle.

On 9 September 2021, KNLA Brigades 3 and 5 captured a Myanmar Army camp in Kyaukkyi Township in Bago Region.

Foreign volunteers 
A number of foreigners have gone to Myanmar to fight for the KNLA.

Dave Everett, a former Australian SAS soldier, fought for the KNLA and was later arrested in Australia for trying to steal money to fund the KNLA. Des Ball, Professor at ANU, has advised them on military strategy.

Thomas Bleming, an American, claims to have fought for the Karen and has written a book called War in Karen Country.

Three of the KNLA's French volunteers were killed in action fighting for the KNLA: Jean-Phillipe Courreges (killed 1985), Olivier Thiriat (killed 1989), and Guillaume Oillic (killed 1990).

References

External links 
 Karen National Union home page
 Victory over KNU, new order on Thai-Burma border
 This Month in History – May
 Karen rebels go on offensive in Myanmar
 Karen National Liberation Army (KNLA) on Schema-root
 BLOG: BURMA CONFLICT SITUATION REPORT
 PHOTO ESSAYS OF ACTIVIST CAUSES AND DEMOS
 Six month battle report for the Karen National Liberation Army
 The flag of the Karen National Liberation Army

Rebel groups in Myanmar
Guerrilla organizations
Karen people
Paramilitary organisations based in Myanmar
1949 establishments in Burma
Separatism in Myanmar